Kirchstetten is a town in district of Sankt Pölten-Land in the Austrian state of Lower Austria.

Population

Personalities
It was the home during part of their lives to the Austrian poet Josef Weinheber and the English poet W. H. Auden. Auden is buried in a Kirchstetten churchyard and his home, at Hinterholz 6, houses a small writer's home museum to the poet in his loft study.

References

External links 
 Kirchstetten website

Literary museums in Austria
Cities and towns in St. Pölten-Land District